The LiAZ-6274 is the urban large class low-floor electric bus produced by the Likinsk Bus Plant. The first fully low-floor electric bus produced in Russia. Designed on the basis of the low-floor bus LiAZ-5292 that mass-produced since 2004. Designed for large cities with intensive passenger traffic. Mass production of this model began in September 2018.

References

Electric buses
Vehicles introduced in 2018